Hans Marius Fogh (8 March 1938 – 14 March 2014) was one of the most successful competitive sailors in history, with dozens of national and international championships and in many different classes, including two Olympic medals.

Olympic career

Representing Denmark 
Fogh represented his country of birth for the first time during the 1960 Summer Olympics in Naples as helmsman in the Danish Flying Dutchman Skum with Ole Gunnar Petersen as crew, and won the silver medal. In 1964 Fogh returned to the Olympics in Enoshima again with Ole Gunnar Petersen as crew, Fogh took 4th place in the Sailing at the 1964 Summer Olympics – Flying Dutchman Miss Denmark 1964. With crew Niels Jensen and again in the Sailing at the 1968 Summer Olympics – Flying Dutchman, Fogh took 16th place in the 1968 in Acapulco. The last time Fogh represented Denmark at the Olympics was in the Flying Dutchman during the 1972 Olympics in Kiel. With Ulrik Brock as crew, Fogh took 7th place.

Representing Canada 
After Fogh emigrated to Canada he was selected to represent his new country at the 1976 Summer Olympics in Kingston. With Evert Bastet as crew, Fogh took 4th place in the Sailing at the 1976 Summer Olympics – Flying Dutchman. His final Olympic appearance came in the Soling at the Los Angeles 1984 Summer Olympics. With fellow crew members Steve Calder and John Kerr Fogh, as helmsman took the bronze medal.

Personal life 
Born on 8 March 1938 in Rødovre, Denmark, Fogh grew up in a family of gardeners and was expected to take over the family business. With the encouragement and support of long-time friend and fellow sailor Paul Henderson, who managed to lever Fogh’s former career as a gardener, Fogh emigrated to Canada in the 1969 and gained Canadian citizenship in 1975. Fogh was married to Kirsten for 49 years. They have two sons (Morten and Thomas) and five grandchildren. Hans Fogh died from Creutzfeldt–Jakob disease on 14 March 2014 in Toronto.

Professional life 
Expected to work in gardening, like the rest of his family, Fogh took a job at Elvstrom sailmakers where he learned the skills of sailmaking. In 1969 he set up a new sailmaking loft in Canada: Elvstrom Canada. Later he produced sails under the labels: Fogh Sails and North Sails. His involvement in the development of the standard Laser sail and the subsequent Laser Radial sail, as well as the Laser 28 sails are of his many well-known accomplishments in his profession.

Sailing career 
Hans Fogh won countless World, Continental, and National Championships in even so many Olympic, International, and National Classes. Hans took part of six Olympic Games (1960, 1964, 1968, 1972, 1976 and 1984) and took a silver medal in the Soling during the Pan Am Games in 1987.
A list of major championships is given on the right.

He helmed Evergreen for Don Green during the 1978 Canada's Cup. He sailed on Canada II during the 1987 Louis Vuitton Cup.

Fogh is an Honoured member of the Canada Sports Hall of Fame from 1985, Canadian Olympic Sports Hall of Fame 1986 and the Etobicoke Sports Halls of Fame.

See also
 List of athletes with the most appearances at Olympic Games

References

1938 births
2014 deaths
1987 America's Cup sailors
Canadian people of Danish descent
Canadian male sailors (sport)
Danish male sailors (sport)
Deaths from Creutzfeldt–Jakob disease
Neurological disease deaths in Ontario
European Champions Soling
Flying Dutchman class world champions
Hellerup Sejlklub sailors
Medalists at the 1960 Summer Olympics
Medalists at the 1984 Summer Olympics
North American Champions Soling
Olympic bronze medalists for Canada
Olympic medalists in sailing
Olympic sailors of Canada
Olympic sailors of Denmark
Olympic silver medalists for Denmark
People from Rødovre
Sailmakers
Sailors at the 1960 Summer Olympics – Flying Dutchman
Sailors at the 1964 Summer Olympics – Flying Dutchman
Sailors at the 1968 Summer Olympics – Flying Dutchman
Sailors at the 1972 Summer Olympics – Flying Dutchman
Sailors at the 1976 Summer Olympics – Flying Dutchman
Sailors at the 1984 Summer Olympics – Soling
Soling class world champions
World champions in sailing for Denmark
Pan American Games medalists in sailing
Pan American Games silver medalists for Canada
Sailors at the 1987 Pan American Games
Medalists at the 1987 Pan American Games
Sportspeople from the Capital Region of Denmark